Daniel Willem Stuyvenberg (Utrecht, Netherlands, 1909-04-14 - 1989-10-17) was Archbishop of Honiara, Solomon Islands.

Stuyvenberg was ordained a priest of the Society of Mary by Archbishop Romolo Carboni on 23 February 1936.

On 27 November 1958, aged 49, he was appointed as Vicar Apostolic of Southern Solomon Islands and as the Titular Bishop of Dionysias. Three months later he was ordained as the Titular Bishop of Dionysias.

On 15 November 1966, aged 57, he was appointed Bishop of Honiara, Solomon Islands. On 15 November 1978, aged 69, he was appointed Archbishop of Honiara. He retired on 3 December 1984.

He died on 17 October 1989, aged 80, as the Archbishop Emeritus of Honiara. He had been a priest for 53 years and a bishop for 30 years.

External links
Catholic Hierarchy

Participants in the Second Vatican Council
1909 births
1989 deaths
Clergy from Utrecht (city)
20th-century Roman Catholic archbishops in Oceania
20th-century Roman Catholic bishops in Oceania
20th-century Dutch Roman Catholic priests
Roman Catholic archbishops of Honiara